William Maloney may refer to:

 William Maloney (politician) (1854–1940), member of the Australian House of Representatives
 William R. Maloney (1929–2018), United States Marine Corps general
 William F. Maloney, economist
 Billy Maloney (1878–1960), American baseball outfielder

See also
 Bill Maloney (born 1958), American businessman and politician